Gulong ng Palad (International title: Stand for Love / ) is a classic Filipino TV tearjerker started as a radio drama aired on DZRH from 1949 to 1956, created by writer Lina Flor. When it was revived as a TV soap aired on BBC/City2 from 1977 to 1979 and from 1983 to 1985 and RPN from 1979 to 1983.

Overview
That was the soap that made a four-year-old child named Romnick Sarmenta an overnight star. He so immersed himself in his character as the Little Peping that televiewers empathize with him. Other members of the cast were Marian dela Riva and Ronald Corveau as Luisa and Carding (they became a real-life couple and have since separated, with Marian now happily remarried and living in the US), Caridad Sanchez as Aling Idad and Augusto Victa as Mang Tomas.

Cast and characters
Ronald Corveau as Carding
Marianne dela Riva as Luisa
Caridad Sanchez as Nanay Idad
Romnick Sarmenta as Peping
Lito Legaspi as Juancho
Augusto Victa as Tatay Tomas
Tita de Villa as Menang
Beth Bautista as Mimi

Remake 

A remake was created by ABS-CBN starring Kristine Hermosa and TJ Trinidad and aired from January 9 to May 12, 2006.

See also
 List of programs aired by Banahaw Broadcasting Corporation
 List of programs previously broadcast by Radio Philippines Network

References

External links
 

1977 Philippine television series debuts
1985 Philippine television series endings
1970s Philippine television series
1980s Philippine television series
Banahaw Broadcasting Corporation original programming
Radio Philippines Network original programming
Filipino-language television shows